BVP can refer to:

 Bavarian People's Party
 Bessemer Venture Partners, an American venture capital firm
 Boundary value problem
 Bo Van Pelt, an American professional golfer